Countess Christina of Salm (1575–1627), was a Duchess consort of Lorraine; married in 1597 to Francis II, Duke of Lorraine.

Life
Christine Katharina was the only daughter and heiress of Count Paul of Salm (1548–1595), head of his branch of the House of Salm (1535–1595) by his wife, Marie Le Veneur (1553–1600), of whom he was a second cousin-once-removed, the couple sharing descent from Philippe Lhuillier, seigneur de Manicamp, governor of the Bastille.

Although the Salms had been semi-sovereign Imperial counts since 1475, neither they nor the Le Veneurs were reckoned among the major magnates of either the Holy Roman Empire or of France in the 16th century. However, when Francis married Christina, he was only the third son of Duke Charles III, destined for the countship of Vaudémont as appanage rather than for the sovereignty of Lorraine. Indeed, to prevent the duchy from leaving the patriline (and to legitimate its usurpation), Francis and Christina's sons would eventually be wed to the two daughters of his elder brother, Duke Henry II of Lorraine.

Issue

 Henri de Lorraine, Marquis of Hattonchâtel (1602–1611) died in childhood;
 Charles de Lorraine, Duke of Lorraine (1604–1675) married Nicolette de Lorraine, no issue; married Baroness Béatrice de Cusance of Belvoir and had issue;
 Henriette de Lorraine (1605–1660), married Louis de Lorraine, Prince of Lixheim, no issue, son of Louis II, Cardinal of Guise;
 Nicolas de Lorraine, Duke of Lorraine (1609–1670) married Claude de Lorraine and had issue;
 Marguerite de Lorraine (1615–1672), married Gaston de France, Duke of Orléans and had issue;
 Christine de Lorraine (1621–1622) died in infancy.

Ancestry

Notes

|-

1570s births
1627 deaths
Duchesses of Lorraine
Salm family